With a Song In My Heart is Stevie Wonder's third studio album, released in 1963 on the Tamla (Motown) label. The album was the first to drop Wonder's Little nickname as the 13-year-old singer went the same route of his label mate Marvin Gaye and covered a set of standards. Like Gaye and other Motown acts, label president Berry Gordy wanted all of his artists to be established on a crossover basis. The album did not immediately spell success for Wonder on the adult contemporary set. Veteran jazz arranger Ernie Wilkins arranged and conducted the album.

Track listing
Side one
"With a Song in My Heart" (Lorenz Hart, Richard Rodgers) – 3:11
"When You Wish Upon a Star" (Ned Washington, Leigh Harline) – 2:59
"Smile" (Charlie Chaplin, Geoffrey Parsons, John Turner) – 3:20
"Make Someone Happy" (Betty Comden, Adolph Green, Jule Styne) – 5:04
"Dream" (Johnny Mercer) – 2:50

Side two
"Put on a Happy Face" (Charles Strouse, Lee Adams) – 2:37
"On the Sunny Side of the Street" (Dorothy Fields, Jimmy McHugh) – 3:58
"Get Happy" (Harold Arlen, Ted Koehler) – 2:12
"Give Your Heart a Chance" (Ron Miller, Orlando Murden, Kenneth O'Neil) – 2:16
"Without a Song" (Edward Eliscu, Billy Rose, Vincent Youmans) – 4:14

Personnel
 Stevie Wonder - vocals, harmonica on "On the Sunny Side of the Street"
 Ernie Wilkins - arranger, conductor
 Various Los Angeles session musicians - instrumentation

References

Stevie Wonder albums
1963 albums
Tamla Records albums
Albums produced by Clarence Paul
Albums produced by William "Mickey" Stevenson
Covers albums
Albums recorded at Hitsville U.S.A.
Albums arranged by Ernie Wilkins
Albums conducted by Ernie Wilkins